The Men's team pursuit at the 2013 UCI Track Cycling World Championships was held on February 20. 15 nations of 4 cyclists each participated in the contest. After the qualifying, the fastest 2 teams raced for gold, and 3rd and 4th teams raced for bronze.

Medalists

Results

Qualifying
The qualifying was held at 13:00.

Finals
The finals were held at 21:15.

Small Final

Final

References

2013 UCI Track Cycling World Championships
UCI Track Cycling World Championships – Men's team pursuit